Only Death Can Kill You is the first collaborative studio album by American rapper Awol One and Canadian producer Factor. It was released on Cornerstone R.A.S. in 2007.

Critical reception
Stewart Mason of AllMusic gave the album 3.5 stars out of 5, describing it as "a hip-hop album that has a consistent mood and sound throughout instead of having to make a virtue of the jigsaw-puzzle quality that comes from the sound of too many collaborators and guest stars." Gentry Boeckel of PopMatters gave the album 6 stars out of 10, saying, "Only Death Can Kill You is the best record of Awol's career, but it could have been the record he kept trying to one-up throughout the rest of his career."

Track listing

References

External links
 

2007 albums
Collaborative albums
Awol One albums
Albums produced by Factor (producer)